The List of shipwrecks in 1760 includes some ships sunk, wrecked or otherwise lost during 1760.

January

6 January

12 January

17 January

Unknown date

February

10 February

15 February

17 February

Unknown date

March

2 March

Unknown date

April

1 April

Unknown date

May

Unknown date

June

22 June

Unknown date

July

8 July

Unknown date

August

5 August

28 August

Unknown date

September

12 September

14 September

27 September

29 September

Unknown date

October

18 October

19 October

25 October

Unknown date

November

1 November

3 November

14 November

28 November

Unknown date

December

4 December

5 December

6 December

21 December

25 December

Unknown date

Unknown date

References

1760